Norartocarpetin is a flavone. It is found in Artocarpus dadah.

See also 
 Dihydromorin, the corresponding flavanonol.

References 

Flavones